Life Gamble, also known as Life Combat, is a 1979 Hong Kong Wuxia film directed by Chang Cheh and starring the Venoms, Kara Hui and Alexander Fu Sheng. It was written by Chang Cheh and I Kuang and produced by the Shaw Brothers Studio.

Plot 
A complex story, about a stolen piece of jade which was originally stolen by 4 thieves (Dick Wei, Bruce Tong, Lau Wai Ling & Suen Shi Pau) that falls into the hands of a habitual gambler named Mao Kai Yuan, knowns as "The Golden Lion" (Wang Lung Wei) and his arrogant anti-hero bodyguard Yun Xiang (Fu Sheng), a knife throwing expert. Various individuals want the jade from Mao Kai Yuan for their own purposes (to get rich or to return it to its owner), particularly the con-woman Peng Shuang Shuang (Shirley Yu) and her hired help, who wants to get it played in a gamble game at Mo Jun Feng's (Lo Mang) small hotel, along with Xiao Qiang (Lin Chen-Chi) and her hired help Xiao Tang (Chiang Sheng), as well as the handless off and on villain Yan Zi Fei (Lu Feng); previously Xiao Qiang and Xiao Tang offered a duel to Yan Zi Fei to defeat his new sword technique, and if he lost he would lose his hand. The sword was made by the blacksmith Qiu Zi Yu (Kuo Chui), who formerly made weapons for kung fu experts with his only payment being for every expert to teach him his kung fu style, and therefore Qiu Zi Yu himself is an expert at various forms of kung fu. However, he retired from making weapons after Yan Zi Fei used his new sword to try to kill Qiu Zi Yu.

Yan Zi Fei indeed lost his hand and lived as a reformed vagabond until hearing about the jade, so he approached Qiu Zi Yu to apologize and ask for a new weapon to replace his hand but Qiu Zi Yu refuses. Peng Shuang Shuang and Mo Jun Feng approach Mao Kai Yuan about the jade and offer him a price (basically give it up or die), however Yun Xiang hears this and challenges Mo Jun Feng who is also a knife expert to a duel which ends up a draw when Mao Kai Yuan intervenes. Xiao Tang approaches Peng Shuang Shuang in private and she seduces and then murders him. A police captain and his daughter Xiao Hong (Kara Hui) arrive and suggest that Peng Shuang Shuang can be absolved of the murder and claim it was self defense if she helps the police officer sneak Xiao Hong into the gambling event. Xiao Hong goes undercover as a maid in Mao Kai Yuan’s house and captures the attention of the interested Yun Xiang, which gets him to think about changing his lifestyle.

Mo Jun Feng approaches Qiu Zi Yu about making more knives for him but again Qiu Zi Yu refuses to make weapons causing Mo Jun Feng to get angry and attack Qiu Zi Yu. Qiu Zi Yu counters all of Mo Jun Feng’s knives and destroys them leaving Mo Jun Feng with no weapons to defend himself and retreat. At this Bruce Tong approaches Qiu Zi Yu and asks why he "does" have weapons (his tools to make things: such as a hammer, a shovel, etc.) and kills a bunch of thugs who also came looking for Qiu Zi Yu to make weapons. Lastly another individual, the nobility member Master Nan (Li Yi-Min) arrives and explains he is the owner of the escort party who lost the jade and asks for Qiu Zi Yu’s help in getting it back. Qiu Zi Yu offers to help but gets assistance from two individuals, he makes an iron hand with darts for Yan Zi Fei if he offers to help Zi Yu and goes straight, he also makes replacement knives for Mo Jun Feng if he also helps and offers to go straight in which both of them agree. At this point everyone flocks to Mao Kai Yuan’s place to get the jade, Peng Shuang Shuang, Mo Jun Feng, Qiu Zi Yu, Yan Zi Fei, and Xiao Qiang, with Xiao Hong and Yun Xiang already on the scene and the police captain waiting at the hotel.

Everyone arrives and the 4 original thieves end up dead thanks to Wag Lung Wei's fixed gambling device. Qiu Zi Yu arrives and gambles with Mao Kai Yuan for the jade saying if he wins he keeps the jade and if he loses he dies. Qiu Zi Yu rigs the gambling piece so that the outcome will be "death" either way for Mao Kai Yuan. Mao Kai Yuan attempts to escape but is killed by the darts in Yan Zi Fei's iron hand. Yan Zi Fei grabs the jade and returns to his usual self (villain) and threatens to kill everyone with his new iron hand if he doesn’t get the jade. Mo Jun Feng attempts to apprehend him but Yan Zi Fei catches his knives with his iron hand and kills Xiao Qiang. Yan Zi Fei tries to fire another dart which backfires and kills him as Qiu Zi Yu rigged his iron hand to need to be "reset" after the fourth dart is fired or it will backfire. Mo Jun Feng and Yun Xiang then get into another knife contest to settle the previous duel which was a draw, this contest ends up being another draw until Yun Xiang throws a magnetic knife which catches Mo Jun Feng knives and kills him. Qiu Zi Yu tries to give the jade to Yun Xiang and Xiao Hong to give it back to the police but Peng Shuang Shuang takes her hostage and escapes. Qiu Zi Yu goes after Peng Shuang Shuang in the hotel and Yun Xiang goes to check on Xiao Hong.

Peng Shuang Shuang has the jade, but it is stolen on the stairs by a thief without her knowledge. She is murdered by a ninja assassin, who doesn’t find the jade but escapes anyway. Qiu Zi Yu convinces the thief to give it up, and Qiu Zi Yu proceeds to return it to the escort service owner. The policeman, Xiao Hong and Yun Xiang arrive looking for the jade. After talking to the thief, the policeman tells him to go find Qiu Zi Yu, explaining that a trap for Qiu Zi Yu has been set up by the escort service, who wants to keep the jade, as it’s worth more than the reward. Qiu Zi Yu meets Master Nan and his escort service but is ambushed and injured, as planned by the treacherous Nan, who seeks this way to put down the stories and rumors about the jade been stolen and the failure of the escort service, which can hurt his family's business as well as his personal pride. The thief returns to tell Yun Xiang, who tracks down the escort service, but not in time to save Qiu Zi Yu. Yun Xiang kills Master Nan and his men and returns the jade to the police.

Cast 
 Alexander Fu Sheng ... Yun Xiang
 Kuo Chui ... Qiu Zi Yu, blacksmith
 Wang Lung Wei ... Mao Kai Yuan, The Golden Lion
 Ku Feng ... Chief Constable Xiao Zi Jing / Police captain
 Kara Hui Ying-Hung ... Xiao Hong
 Chiang Sheng ... Xiao Tang, The Deadly Whip
 Shirley Yu ... Peng Shuang Shuang
 Lu Feng ... Yan Zi Fei
 Lo Mang ... Mo Jun Feng, swordsman
 Li Yi-Min ... Master Nan
 Lin Chen-Chi ... Xiao Qiang
 Danny Lee ... Escort boss
 Liu Hui-Ling ... Zhen Liu-Xiang a.k.a. the Golden Hairpin

Release 
As with House of Traps, Life Gamble was available as a Region 3 Celestial DVD reissue. Although it was difficult to purchase in other regional codings -except in degraded VHS tapes-, the film is currently available on Region 1 DVD from Funimation. It has a new NTSC transfer and Mandarin/English language audio options with subtitles.

References

External links 
 

Kung fu films
Hong Kong martial arts films
Shaw Brothers Studio films
1979 films
Funimation
Films directed by Chang Cheh
1970s Hong Kong films